Induratana Paribatra (born 2 February 1922) is the eldest daughter of Paribatra Sukhumbandhu, Prince of Nakhon Sawan and Sombandh Paribatra na Ayudhaya (née Palakawong na Ayudhaya). She was titled Her Highness in King Prajadhipok, Rama VII, but Induratana relinquished her royal titles to marry Somwang Sarasas and had three children.

Biography
Princess Induratana was the 9th child of Paribatra Sukhumbandhu, Prince of Nakhon Sawan and the 1st of Sombandh Paribatra na Ayudhaya (née Palakawong na Ayudhaya). She had 1 younger brother Prince Sukhumabhinanda, as well as an older half-brother and sister. She was titled Her Highness (พระวรวงศ์เธอ Phra Worawong Thoe) in the reign of King Prajadhipok, Rama VII (1927).

Marriage
Induratana relinquished her royal titles to marry Somwang Sarasas on February 4, 1953. Somwang Sarasas (née Sundananda) is the older brother of Ngarmchit Purachatra na Ayudhaya (wife of Prince Prem Purachatra). She and Sarasas have three children. Later, both divorced.
 Thoranin Sarasas married Sunittra Rueangsomwong
 Sinnapa Sarasas married Anan Taratai
 Santi Sarasas (né Phayanin)

Titles
 2 February 1922 — 1927 : Her Serene Highness Princess Induratana Paribatra
 1927 — 1953 : Her Highness Princess Induratana
 1953 — ? : Mrs. Induratana Sarasas
  ? — present : Mrs. Induratana Paribatra

Ancestry

References

1922 births
Living people
20th-century Chakri dynasty
21st-century Chakri dynasty
Induratana Paribatra
Induratana Paribatra
Induratana Paribatra
Induratana Paribatra
Thai female Phra Ong Chao
Women centenarians